Tony Rampling (born 25 October 1961) is a former professional rugby league footballer who played in the New South Wales Rugby League. During his career he played for the South Sydney Rabbitohs (two spells), Eastern Suburbs, Gold Coast Chargers, Salford City Reds and the Western Suburbs Magpies.

In 1982, Rampling was selected to represent New South Wales as a second-rower for games I and II of the 1982 State of Origin series and again in 1985, for game III as a reserve. Hard-as-nails, Rampling retired at the end of the 1992 season, age 31.

References

External links
 

1961 births
Living people
Australian rugby league players
Gold Coast Chargers players
New South Wales Rugby League State of Origin players
Place of birth missing (living people)
Rugby league players from Tweed Heads, New South Wales
Rugby league props
Rugby league second-rows
Salford Red Devils players
South Sydney Rabbitohs players
Sydney Roosters players
Western Suburbs Magpies players